Events from the year 1630 in Sweden

Incumbents
 Monarch – Gustaf II Adolf

Events

 
 
 
 
 
 
 June 6 – Swedish warships depart from Stockholm for Germany.
 July 6 – Swedish intervention in the Thirty Years' War begins when King Gustav Adolf of Sweden, leading an army of 13,000 on the protestant side, makes landfall at Peenemünde, Pomerania.
 July 9 – Thirty Years' War: Stettin is taken by Swedish forces.
 September 4 – Thirty Years' War: the Treaty of Stettin is signed by Sweden and the Duchy of Pomerania, forming a close alliance between them, as well as giving Sweden full military control over Pomerania.

Births

 12 December – Olaus Rudbeck, physicist and anatomist  (died 1702) 
 Maria Jonae Palmgren, scholar, one of the first female college students (died 1708)

Deaths

 Margareta Hybertsson, shipbuilder

References

External links

 
Years of the 17th century in Sweden
Sweden